Anatoly Konstantinovich Lyadov was a Russian composer, teacher, and conductor.

Biography 

Lyadov was born in 1855 in St. Petersburg, into a family of eminent Russian musicians. He was taught informally by his conductor step-father Konstantin Lyadov from 1860 to 1868, and then in 1870 entered the St. Petersburg Conservatory to study piano and violin.

He soon gave up instrumental study to concentrate on counterpoint and fugue, although he remained a fine pianist.  His natural musical talent was highly thought of by, among others, Modest Mussorgsky, and during the 1870s he became associated with the group of composers known as The Five.  He entered the composition classes of Nikolai Rimsky-Korsakov, but was expelled for absenteeism in 1876.  In 1878 he was readmitted to these classes to help him complete his graduation composition.

Family 
 grandfather on his father's side – Nikolai G. Lyadov was a conductor of Petersburg Philharmonic Society
 father Konstantin Lyadov – chief conductor of the Imperial Opera Company
 mother V Antipova – pianist
 sister Valentina K. Lyadova – dramatic actress
 the first sister's husband Mikhail Sariotti – the famous Russian opera singer; the second: Ivan Pomazanskiy - the Russian musician
 uncle (father's brother) Alexander Lyadov (1818–1871) – the conductor of the orchestra of the Imperial Ballroom
 cousin (uncle's daughter) Vera Lyadova-Ivanova (1839–1870) – a famous Russian actress and singer who became famous in operettas, married Lev Ivanov
 cousin's husband (divorce) Lev Ivanov – the famous Russian ballet dancer and choreographer and his descendants now live in Iran with their second family (Zartari).

Teacher 
He taught at the St. Petersburg Conservatory from 1878, his pupils including Sergei Prokofiev, Nikolai Myaskovsky, Mikhail Gnesin, Lazare Saminsky, Lyubov Streicher, and Boris Asafyev.  Consistent with his character, he was a variable but at times brilliant instructor. Conductor Nikolai Malko, who studied harmony with him at the conservatory, wrote, "Lyadov's critical comments were always precise, clear, understandable, constructive, and brief.... And it was done indolently, without haste, sometimes seemingly disdainfully. He could suddenly stop in midword, take out some small scissors from his pocket and start doing something with his fingernail, while we all waited."

Igor Stravinsky remarked that Lyadov was as strict with himself as he was with his pupils, writing with great precision and demanding fine attention to detail. Prokofiev recalled that even the most innocent musical innovations drove the conservative Lyadov crazy. "Shoving his hands in his pockets and rocking in his soft woollen shoes without heels, he would say, 'I don't understand why you are studying with me. Go to Richard Strauss. Go to Debussy.' This was said in a tone that meant 'Go to the devil!'" Still, Lyadov told his acquaintances about Prokofiev. "I am obliged to teach him. He must form his technique, his style—first in piano music." In 1905, he resigned briefly over the dismissal of Rimsky-Korsakov, only to return when Rimsky-Korsakov was reinstated.

Glazunov, Belyayev and Tchaikovsky 
 Lyadov introduced timber millionaire and philanthropist Mitrofan Belyayev to the music of the teenage Alexander Glazunov. Interest in Glazunov's music quickly grew to Belyayev's patronage of an entire group of Russian nationalist composers. In 1884 Belyayev instituted the Russian Symphony Concerts and established an annual Glinka Prize. The following year he started his own publishing house in Leipzig. He published music by Glazunov, Lyadov, Rimsky-Korsakov and Borodin at his own expense. In addition, young composers appealed for Belyayev's help. Belyayev asked Lyadov to serve with Glazunov and Rimsky-Korsakov on an advisory council to help select from these applicants. The group of composers that formed eventually became known as the Belyayev Circle.

In November 1887, Lyadov met Pyotr Ilyich Tchaikovsky. Nearly seven years earlier Tchaikovsky had given a negative opinion to the publisher Besel about a piano arabesque Lyadov had written. Even before this visit, though, Tchaikovsky's opinion of Lyadov may have been changing. He had honored Lyadov with a copy of the score of his Manfred Symphony. Now that he had actually met the man face-to-face, the younger composer became "dear Lyadov." He became a frequent visitor to Lyadov and the rest of the Belyayev Circle, beginning in the winter of 1890.

Later years 
He married into money in 1884, acquiring through his marriage a country property in Polynovka estate, Borovichevsky uezd, Novgorod Governorate, where he spent his summers composing unhurriedly, and where he died in 1914.

Music 

While Lyadov's technical facility was highly regarded by his contemporaries, his unreliability stood in the way of his advancement. His published compositions are relatively few due to a certain self-critical lack of confidence.  Many of his works are variations on or arrangements of pre-existing material (for example his Russian Folksongs, Op. 58).  He did compose a large number of piano miniatures, of which his Musical Snuffbox of 1893 is perhaps most famous.

Like many of his contemporaries, Lyadov was drawn to intensely Russian subjects. Much of his music is programmatic; for example his tone poems Baba Yaga Op. 56, Kikimora Op. 63, The Enchanted Lake Op. 62 (inspired by the painting by Arseny Meshchersky, "The Enchanted Lake"). These short tone poems, probably his most popular works, exhibit an exceptional flair for orchestral tone color.  In his later compositions he experimented with extended tonality, like his younger contemporary Alexander Scriabin.

It has been argued that Lyadov never completed a large-scale work.  However, many of his miniatures have their place in the repertory. In 1905 Lyadov began work on a new ballet score, but when the work failed to progress, he shifted gears to work on an opera instead.  Lyadov never finished the opera, but sections of the work found realization in the short tone poems Kikimora and The Enchanted Lake.

In 1909 Sergei Diaghilev commissioned Lyadov to orchestrate a number for the Chopin-based ballet Les Sylphides, and on 4 September that year wrote to the composer asking for a new ballet score for the 1910 season of his Ballets Russes; however, despite the much-repeated story that Lyadov was slow to start composing the work which eventually became The Firebird (famously fulfilled by the then relatively inexperienced Igor Stravinsky), there is no evidence that Lyadov ever accepted the commission.

Selected works 
 Biryulki, 14 pieces for piano, Op. 2 (1876)
 Six Pieces for piano, Op. 3 (1876–1877)
 Prelude in D major
 Gigue in F major
 Fugue in G minor
 Mazurka in G major
 Mazurka in B major
 Mazurka in C major
 Four Arabesques for piano, Op. 4 (1878)
 Arabesque in C minor
 Arabesque in A major
 Arabesque in B major
 Arabesque in E major
 Etude in A major for piano, Op. 5 (1881)
 Impromptu in D major for piano, Op. 6 (1881)
 Two Intermezzi for piano, Op. 7 (1881)
 Intermezzo in D major
 Intermezzo in F major
 Two Intermezzi for piano, Op. 8 (1883)
 Intermezzo in B major
 Intermezzo in B major
 Two Pieces for piano, Op. 9 (1883)
 Valse in F minor
 Mazurka in A major
 Three Pieces for piano, Op. 10 (1884)
 Prelude in D major
 Mazurka in C major
 Mazurka in D major
 Three Pieces for piano, Op. 11 (1885)
 Prelude in B minor
 Mazurka in the Dorian Mode
 Mazurka in F minor
 Etude in E major for piano, Op. 12 (1886)
 Four Preludes for piano, Op. 13 (1887)
 Prelude in G major
 Prelude in B major
 Prelude in A major
 Prelude in F minor
 Two Mazurkas for piano, Op. 15 (1887)
 Mazurka in A major
 Mazurka in A minor
 Scherzo in D major for orchestra, Op. 16 (1879–1886)
 Two Bagatelles for piano, Op. 17 (1887)
 Bagatelle in B minor (La Douleur)
 Bagatelle in B major (Pastoral)
 Village Scene by the Inn, Mazurka for orchestra, Op. 19 (1887)
 Novellette in A minor for piano, Op. 20 (1882–1889)
 About Olden Times, Ballade in D major for piano, Op. 21a (1889)
 About Olden Times, Ballade in D major for orchestra, Op. 21b (1889)
 In the Clearing, Esquisse in F major for piano, Op. 23 (1890)
 Two Pieces for piano, Op. 24 (1890)
 Prelude in E major
 Berceuse in G major
 Idylle in D major for piano, Op. 25 (1891)
 Little Waltz in G major for piano, Op. 26 (1891)
 Three Preludes for piano, Op. 27 (1891)
 Prelude in E major
 Prelude in B major
 Prelude in G major
 Final scene from Schiller's Die Braut von Messina for solo voices, chorus and orchestra, Op. 28 (1878, published 1891).  This was his graduation piece.
 Kukolki (Marionettes) in E major for piano, Op. 29 (1892)
 Bagatelle in D major for piano, Op. 30 (1889)
 Two Pieces for piano, Op. 31 (1893)
 'Rustic' Mazurka in G major
 Prelude in B minor
 Muzikalnaya tabakerka (A musical snuffbox) in A major for piano, Op. 32 (1893)
 Three Pieces for piano, Op. 33 (1889)
 Prelude on a Russian theme in A major
 Grotesque in C major
 Pastoral in F major
 Three Canons for piano, Op. 34 (1894)
 Canon in G major
 Canon in C minor
 Canon in F major
 Variations on a Theme by Glinka in B major for piano, Op. 35 (1894)
 Three Preludes for piano, Op. 36 (1895)
 Prelude in F major
 Prelude in B minor
 Prelude in G major
 Etude in F major for piano, Op. 37 (1895)
 Mazurka in F major for piano, Op. 38 (1895)
 Four Preludes for piano, Op. 39 (1895)
 Prelude in A major
 Prelude in C minor
 Prelude in B major
 Prelude in F minor
 Etude and Three Preludes for piano, Op. 40 (1897)
 Etude in C minor
 Prelude in C major
 Prelude in D minor
 Prelude in D major
 Two Fugues for piano, Op. 41 (1896)
 Fugue in F minor
 Fugue in D minor
 Two Preludes and Mazurka for piano, Op. 42 (1898)
 Prelude in B major
 Prelude in B major
 Mazurka on Polish Themes in A major
 Barcarolle in F major for piano, Op. 44 (1898)
 Four Preludes for piano, Op. 46 (1899)
 Prelude in B major
 Prelude in G minor
 Prelude in G major
 Prelude in E minor
 Two Pieces for piano, Op. 48 (1899)
 Etude in A major
 Canzonetta in B major
 Polonaise in C major ("In Memory of Pushkin") for orchestra, Op. 49 (1899)
 Variations on a Polish Folk Theme in A major for piano, Op. 51 (1901)
 Three Ballet Pieces for piano, Op. 52 (1901)
 in E major
 in C major
 in A major
 Three Bagatelles for piano, Op. 53 (1903)
 Bagatelle in B major
 Bagatelle in G major
 Bagatelle in A major
 Polonaise in D major for orchestra, Op. 55 (1902)
 Baba Yaga for orchestra, Op. 56 (1891–1904)
 Three Pieces for piano, Op. 57 (1900–1905)
 Prelude in D major
 Waltz in E major
 Mazurka in F minor
 Eight Russian Folksongs for orchestra, Op. 58 (1906)
 Religious Chant. Moderato
 Christmas Carol 'Kolyada'. Allegretto
 Plaintive Song. Andante
 Humorous Song 'I Danced With The Gnat'./Allegretto
 Legend Of The Birds. Allegretto
 Cradle Song. Moderato
 Round Dance. Allegro
 Village Dance Song. Vivo
 Ten Arrangements from Obikhod (a collection of old Russian Orthodox liturgical chants), Op. 61 (1909)
 Stichira for the Nativity of Christ
 Troparion for the Nativity of Christ "Rozdestvo Tvoe, Christe Bozhe nash"
 Kondakion for the Nativity of Christ
 Troparions "Blagoobrazny Iosiph (Prosperous Joseph)" and "Mironositsam zhenam (For myrrh-bearers wives)"
 Chertog Tvoy vizhdu Zadostoinik na Vozdvizhenie Cherubical song Tebe poem (To You we sing) Khvalite Gospoda s nebes Chashu spaseniya priimu Volshebnoye ozero (The Enchanted Lake) for orchestra, Op. 62 (1909)
 Kikimora for orchestra, Op. 63 (1909)
 Four Pieces for piano Op. 64 (1909–1910)
 Grimace
 Gloom
 Temptation
 Reminiscences
 Dance of the Amazon for orchestra, Op. 65 (1910)
 From the Apocalypse, symphonic picture for orchestra, Op. 66 (1910–1912)
 Nénie for orchestra, Op. 67 (1914)

 References 

 Sources 

Brown, David, Tchaikovsky: The Final Years, 1885–1893, (New York: W.W. Norton & Company, 1991). .
Maes, Francis, tr. Arnold J. Pomerans and Erica Pomerans, A History of Russian Music: From Kamarinskaya to Babi Yar (Berkeley, Los Angeles and London: University of California Press, 2002). .
Rimsky-Korsakov, Nikolai, Letoppis Moyey Muzykalnoy Zhizni (St. Petersburg, 1909), published in English as My Musical Life (New York: Knopf, 1925, 3rd ed. 1942). ISBN n/a.
Taruskin, Richard, Stravinsky and the Russian Traditions (Oxford: Oxford University Press, 1996). .
Volkov, Solomon, tr. Antonina W. Bouis, St. Petersburg: A Cultural History'' (New York: The Free Press, 1995). .

External links 

Naxos site about Liadov's life and music
Lyadov Music Society (Russia)
Article about Lyadov and his op. 63, the tone poem Kikimora (in Spanish)
 

1855 births
1914 deaths
19th-century classical composers
19th-century conductors (music)
20th-century classical composers
20th-century Russian conductors (music)
Russian male conductors (music)
20th-century Russian male musicians
Burials at Tikhvin Cemetery
Musicians from Saint Petersburg
Pupils of Nikolai Rimsky-Korsakov
Russian male classical composers
Russian Romantic composers
Saint Petersburg Conservatory alumni